Julio (Julian) Servin was an American soccer defender who earned one cap with the U.S. national team in a 1-0 loss to Poland on August 3, 1973.   Servin, and most of his team mates, were from the second division American Soccer League after the first division North American Soccer League refused to release players for the game.

References

External links

Year of birth missing (living people)
Living people
American Soccer League (1933–1983) players
United States men's international soccer players
American soccer players
Cleveland Cobras players
Association football defenders